The 2019–20 Villanova Wildcats men's basketball team represented Villanova University in the 2019–20 NCAA Division I men's basketball season. Led by head coach Jay Wright in his 19th year, the Wildcats played their home games at the Finneran Pavilion  on the school's campus in the Philadelphia suburb of Villanova, Pennsylvania and Wells Fargo Center as members of the Big East Conference. They finished the season 24–7, 13–5 in Big East play which put them in a three-way tie for first place. As the No. 2 seed in the Big East tournament, they were slated to play DePaul in the quarterfinals, but the Tournament was cancelled due to the COVID-19 pandemic, along with the rest of the NCAA postseason.  The team officially finished ninth in the Coaches Poll and tenth in the AP Poll, which served as de facto selectors during the season.

Previous season
The Wildcats finished the 2018-19 season 26–10, 13–5 in Big East play to finish in first place. They defeated Providence, Xavier, and Seton Hall to win the Big East tournament. As a result, the Wildcats received the conference's automatic bid to the NCAA tournament as the No. 6 seed in the South region. There they defeated Saint Mary's before losing to Purdue in the Second Round.

Awards & Accomplishments

Big East Co-Regular Season Champion

Philadelphia Big 5 Champion

Saddiq Bey

NCAA AP Honorable Mention

Julius Erving Award 

All-Big East First Team

Robert V. Geasey Trophy

All-Big 5 First Team

Collin Gillespie

All-Big East Second Team

All-Big 5 First Team

Jeremiah Robinson-Earl

Big East Freshman of the Year

Big East All-Freshman Team

Big 5 Freshman of the Year

All-Big 5 Second Team

Jermaine Samuels

All-Big 5 Second Team

Nova Hoops Mania Dunk Contest Champion

Justin Moore

Big East All-Freshman Team

Cole Swider

Nova Hoops Mania 3-Point Contest Champion

Offseason

Departures

2019 recruiting class

Incoming Transfers

Roster

Schedule and results

|-
!colspan=12 style=|Exhibition

|-
|-
!colspan=12 style=|Regular season

|-
!colspan=9 style=|Big East tournament

Rankings

*AP does not release post-NCAA Tournament rankings^Coaches did not release a Week 1 poll.

References

Villanova
Villanova Wildcats men's basketball seasons
Villanova
Villanova